Schefflera harmsii is a species of plant in the family Araliaceae. It is endemic to Peru.

References

Flora of Peru
harmsii
Data deficient plants
Taxonomy articles created by Polbot
Taxobox binomials not recognized by IUCN